The Asia–Europe Meeting (ASEM) is an Asian–European political dialogue forum to enhance relations and various forms of cooperation between its partners. 
It was officially established on 1 March 1996 at the 1st ASEM Summit (ASEM1) in Bangkok, Thailand, by the then 15 Member States of the European Union (EU) and the European Commission, the then 7 Member States of the Association of Southeast Asian Nations (ASEAN), and the individual countries of China, Japan, and South Korea. A series of enlargements saw additional EU Member States join as well as India, Mongolia, Pakistan and the ASEAN Secretariat in 2008, Australia, New Zealand and Russia in 2010, Bangladesh, Norway, and Switzerland in 2012, as well as Croatia, and Kazakhstan in 2014.

The main components of the ASEM Process rest on the following 3 pillars:
 Political Pillar
 Economic & Financial Pillar
 Social, Cultural & Educational Pillar

In general, the ASEM Process is considered by the Partners involved to be a way of deepening the relations between Asia and Europe at all levels, which is deemed necessary to achieve a more balanced political and economic world order. The process is enhanced by the biennial meetings of Heads of State and Government, alternately in Asia and Europe, and biennial meetings of Foreign Ministers as well as other Ministerial Meetings, and other political, economic, and socio-cultural events at various levels.

Partners
The ASEM Partnership currently has 53 Partners: 51 countries and 2 regional organisations. The countries are Australia, Austria, Bangladesh, Belgium, Brunei, Bulgaria, Cambodia, China, Croatia, Cyprus, the Czech Republic, Denmark, Estonia, Finland, France, Germany, Greece, Hungary, India, Indonesia, Ireland, Italy, Japan, Kazakhstan, Laos, Latvia, Lithuania, Luxembourg, Malaysia, Malta, Mongolia, Myanmar, the Netherlands, New Zealand, Norway, Pakistan, the Philippines, Poland, Portugal, Romania, Russia, Singapore, Slovakia, Slovenia, South Korea, Spain, Sweden, Switzerland, Thailand, the United Kingdom and Vietnam while the European Union and the ASEAN Secretariat are the regional organisations involved.

Meetings

ASEM Summits
Biennial Summits are held alternating between Asia and Europe, attended by the Heads of State and Government of the respective partner countries and organisations:
 ASEM13: 25–26 November 2021,  Phnom Penh, Cambodia 
 ASEM12: 18–19 October 2018, Brussels, Belgium, hosted by the European Union 
 ASEM11: 15–16 July 2016, Ulaanbaatar, Mongolia 
 ASEM10: 16–17 October 2014, Milan, Italy 
 ASEM9: 05–06 November 2012, Vientiane, Laos 
 ASEM8: 04–05 October 2010, Brussels, Belgium 
 ASEM7: 24–25 October 2008, Beijing, China 
 ASEM6: 10–11 September 2006, Helsinki, Finland 
 ASEM5: 08–09 October 2004, Hanoi, Vietnam 
ASEM4: 22–24 September 2002, Copenhagen, Denmark 
 ASEM3: 20–21 October 2000, Seoul, South Korea 
 ASEM2: 03–04 April 1998, London, United Kingdom 
 ASEM1:  01–02 March 1996, Bangkok, Thailand

ASEM Ministerial Meetings
Aside from Summits, regular Ministerial Meetings are held on foreign affairs, financial, cultural, economic, educational, labor and employment, transport, or environmental issues, attended by the relevant ministers:

ASEM Foreign Ministers' Meetings (ASEMFMM)
 ASEMFMM14: 15-16 December 2019, Madrid, Spain 
 ASEMFMM13: 20–21 November 2017, Naypyidaw, Myanmar 
 ASEMFMM12: 05–06 November 2015, Luxembourg, Luxembourg 
 ASEMFMM11: 11–12 November 2013, New Delhi, India 
 ASEMFMM10: 06–07 June 2011, Gödöllő, Hungary 
 ASEMFMM9: 25–26 May 2009, Hanoi, Vietnam 
 ASEMFMM8: 28–29 May 2007, Hamburg, Germany 
 ASEMFMM7: 06–07 May 2005, Kyoto, Japan 
 ASEMFMM6: 17–18 April 2004, Kildare, Ireland 
 ASEMFMM5: 23–24 July 2003, Bali, Indonesia 
 ASEMFMM4: 06–07 June 2002, Madrid, Spain  
 ASEMFMM3: 24–25 May 2001, Beijing, China 
 ASEMFMM2: 29 March 1999, Berlin, Germany 
 ASEMFMM1: 15 February 1997, Singapore, Singapore

ASEM Finance Ministers’ Meetings (ASEMFinMM)
 ASEMFinMM14: 2020, Dhaka, Bangladesh  
 ASEMFinMM13: 26 April 2018, Sofia, Bulgaria 
 ASEMFinMM12: 09–10 June 2016, Ulaanbaatar, Mongolia 
 ASEMFinMM11: 11–12 September 2014, Milan, Italy 
 ASEMFinMM10: 15 October 2012, Bangkok, Thailand 
 ASEMFinMM9: 17–18 April 2010, Madrid, Spain 
 ASEMFinMM8: 16 June 2008, Jeju, South Korea 
 ASEMFinMM7: 08–09 April 2006, Vienna, Austria 
 ASEMFinMM6: 25–26 June 2005, Tianjin, China 
 ASEMFinMM5: 05–06 July 2003, Bali, Indonesia 
 ASEMFinMM4: 05–06 July 2002, Copenhagen, Denmark 
 ASEMFinMM3: 13–14 January 2001, Kobe, Japan 
 ASEMFinMM2: 15–16 September 1999, Frankfurt, Germany 
 ASEMFinMM1: 19 September 1997, Bangkok, Thailand

ASEM Culture Ministers' Meetings (ASEMCMM)
 ASEMCMM9: 2020, Asia
 ASEMCMM8: 01-02 March 2018, Sofia, Bulgaria 
 ASEMCMM7: 22–24 June 2016, Gwangju, South Korea 
 ASEMCMM6: 20–21 October 2014, Rotterdam, Netherlands 
 ASEMCMM5: 18–19 September 2012, Yogyakarta, Indonesia 
 ASEMCMM4: 08–10 September 2010, Poznań, Poland 
 ASEMCMM3: 21–24 April 2008, Kuala Lumpur, Malaysia 
 ASEMCMM2: 06–07 June 2005, Paris, France 
 ASEMCMM1: 03 December 2003, Beijing, China

ASEM Economic Ministers' Meetings (ASEMEMM)

 ASEMEMM7: 21–22 September 2017, Seoul, South Korea 
 High-level Meeting: 16-17 September 2005, Rotterdam, Netherlands 
 ASEMEMM5: 23–24 July 2003, Dalian, China 
 ASEMEMM4: 18–19 September 2002, Copenhagen, Denmark 
 ASEMEMM3: 10–11 September 2001, Hanoi, Vietnam 
 ASEMEMM2: 09–10 October 1999, Berlin, Germany 
 ASEMEMM1: 27–28 September 1997, Makuhari, Japan

ASEM Education Ministers' Meetings (ASEMME)
ASEMME8: 2021, Thailand 
 ASEMME7: 15-16 May 2019, Bucharest, Romania 
 ASEMME6: 21–22 November 2017, Seoul, South Korea 
 ASEMME5: 27–28 April 2015, Riga, Latvia 
 ASEMME4: 12–14 May 2013, Kuala Lumpur, Malaysia 
 ASEMME3: 09–10 May 2011, Copenhagen, Denmark 
 ASEMME2: 14–15 May 2009, Hanoi, Vietnam 
 ASEMME1: 05–06 May 2008, Berlin, Germany

ASEM Labour & Employment Ministers’ Conferences (ASEMLEMC)
 ASEMLEMC5: 03–04 December 2015, Sofia, Bulgaria 
ASEMLEMC4: 24–26 October 2012, Hanoi, Vietnam 
 ASEMLEMC3: 12–14 December 2010, Leiden, Netherlands 
 ASEMLEMC2: 13–15 October 2008, Bali, Indonesia 
 ASEMLEMC1: 03 September 2006, Potsdam, Germany

ASEM Transport Ministers' Meetings (ASEMTMM)
 ASEMTMM5: 11-12 December 2019, Budapest, Hungary 
 ASEMTMM4: 26–28 September 2017, Bali, Indonesia 
 ASEMTMM3: 29–30 April 2015, Riga, Latvia 
 ASEMTMM2: 24–25 October 2011, Chengdu, China 
 ASEMTMM1: 19–20 October 2009, Vilnius, Lithuania

ASEM Environment Ministers' Meetings (ASEMEnvMM)
 ASEMEnvMM4: 22–23 May 2012, Ulaanbaatar, Mongolia 
 ASEMEnvMM3: 23–26 April 2007, Copenhagen, Denmark 
 ASEMEnvMM2: 12–13 October 2003, Lecce, Italy 
 ASEMEnvMM1: 17 January 2002, Beijing, China

ASEM Ministerial Conference on Energy Security (ASEMESMC)
 ASEMESMC1: 17–18 June 2009, Brussels, Belgium

See also
 Asia-Europe Foundation (ASEF), the only permanently established institution under the ASEM framework

References

External links
 ASEM InfoBoard, the official information platform of the Asia-Europe Meeting (ASEM)
 Introduction to the Asia-Europe Meeting
 ASEM in Its Tenth Year: Looking Forward, Looking Back 
Asia-Europe People's Forum (AEPF)
Asia-Europe Labour Forum (AELF)
 ASEM Education Secretariat (AES)
 Asia-Europe Foundation (ASEF), the only permanently established institution under the ASEM framework
 ASEF Classroom Network (ASEF ClassNet)
 Asia-Europe Museum Network (ASEMUS) 
 ASEF University Alumni Network (ASEFUAN)
 Asia-Europe Institute (AEI)

ASEAN meetings
Organizations associated with ASEAN
European Union and third organisations
20th-century diplomatic conferences
21st-century diplomatic conferences